People Like Us (known during production as Welcome to People) is a 2012 American drama film directed by Alex Kurtzman in his directorial debut. The film was written by Kurtzman, Roberto Orci and Jody Lambert, and stars Chris Pine, Elizabeth Banks, Olivia Wilde, Michael Hall D'Addario and Michelle Pfeiffer. A. R. Rahman composed the soundtrack. The film was released by Walt Disney Studios Motion Pictures through Touchstone Pictures on June 29, 2012.

Plot 
Sam Harper, a struggling corporate trader in New York City, may have violated federal law and faces a possible Federal Trade Commission investigation. Sam's boss urges him to bribe federal officials. Returning home, Sam's girlfriend Hannah informs him that his estranged father, Jerry, has died. Sam and Hannah fly to Los Angeles, where he has a tense reunion with his mother, Lillian.

Jerry's lawyer and friend, Ike, tells Sam he will not inherit any money. The lawyer hands him a shaving kit containing $150,000 in cash and a note stipulating that the money be delivered to Josh Davis.

Josh is a troubled 11-year-old boy whose bartender mother, Frankie Davis, is a recovering alcoholic. Sam secretly follows Frankie to an Alcoholics Anonymous meeting. He learns she is Jerry's illegitimate daughter, making Frankie Sam's paternal half-sister, and Josh his nephew. When Sam tells Hannah he intends to keep the money, Hannah, disgusted, returns to New York.

Sam introduces himself to Frankie as a visiting fellow alcoholic, and soon becomes involved in their life, gradually growing closer. He learns that Jerry visited Frankie and her mother on Sundays, and that Frankie has never met her father's wife and son. Meanwhile, Sam broods over his deepening legal troubles. Frankie does not want Sam around Josh anymore because she fears he will return to New York, upsetting Josh. Sam decides to leave, but returns to pick up Josh from school. Frankie later calls Sam, telling him Josh has been in a fight.

Sam eventually reveals that he is Jerry's son, resulting in Frankie exploding in anger and ordering him to leave. Later, Lillian is hospitalized following a heart condition. Hannah finds Sam in the waiting room, and they reconcile. Hannah has enrolled into UCLA's law program to remain close to Sam after realizing he wants to be with his family. Meanwhile, Frankie receives Jerry's money through a lawyer. Frankie quits her job, enrolls in school, and move into a suburban neighborhood with Josh. She cuts contact with Sam.

After being discharged from the hospital, Lillian tells Sam that she forced Jerry to choose their family over Frankie and her mother. She was protecting Sam, but Jerry instead rejected his son because he was a reminder of the daughter he abandoned. One day, Josh, who is having difficulty adjusting to Sam's absence, tries to find him after obtaining Lillian's address.

When Sam visits Frankie, he asks her forgiveness and wants to be her brother and Josh's uncle and father figure. He shows her an old film reel that Jerry shot of a young Sam at a playground. In the film, a girl joins Sam, and Frankie realizes that Jerry had regularly brought her and Sam to play together and thus loved both his children. At this recognition, Frankie accepts Sam as her brother.

Cast 
 Chris Pine as Sam Harper – Jerry's son – Frankie's brother
 Elizabeth Banks as Frankie Davis – Josh's mother – Sam's sister
 Olivia Wilde as Hannah – Sam's girlfriend
 Michael Hall D'Addario as Josh Alan Davis – Frankie's son – Sam's nephew 
 Michelle Pfeiffer as Lillian Harper – Sam's mom
 Mark Duplass as Ted – Neighbor
 Philip Baker Hall as Ike Rafferty – Estate attorney
 Jon Favreau as Richards – Sam's boss
 Sara Mornell as Dr. Amanda – Psychiatrist

Soundtrack 

The soundtrack for the film was composed by Academy Award Winner A. R. Rahman. The film marks his first collaboration with Alex Kurtzman. In an interview, Rahman quoted the director's words on film's music: "Alex said [the music] can't be epic, it can't be world music... I was following his vision, while at the same time sticking to something that I wanted to do." The soundtrack was released 19 June 2012 via Lakeshore Records.

In the movie, when Sam first puts on one of Jerry's records, the song "Fast as a Shark" can be heard in the background.

Home media 
People Like Us was released on Blu-ray, DVD, and digital download on 2 October 2012 from Touchstone Home Entertainment. The release was produced in two different physical packages: a 2-disc combo pack (Blu-ray and DVD), and a 1-disc DVD.

Reception 
On Rotten Tomatoes, the film holds a rating of 53% based on 120 reviews, with an average score of 5.70/10. The site's critical consensus reads, "Though calculated and melodramatic, People Like Us benefits from a pair of solid leads and its rare screenplay that caters to adult filmgoers." On Metacritic, the film has a score of 49 out of 100, based on 31 critics, indicating "mixed or average reviews".

Notes

References

External links 
 
 
 
 

2012 films
2012 directorial debut films
2012 drama films
American drama films
Drama films based on actual events
DreamWorks Pictures films
Films about atonement
Films about dysfunctional families
Films about siblings
Films produced by Roberto Orci
Films produced by Clayton Townsend
Films scored by A. R. Rahman
Films set in Los Angeles
Films set in New York City
Films with screenplays by Alex Kurtzman and Roberto Orci
K/O Paper Products films
Reliance Entertainment films
Touchstone Pictures films
2010s English-language films
2010s American films